The United States Baseball League was a short-lived hopeful third major-league that was established in New York City in 1912 and lasted only one partial season.

History
In March 1912, organizers of the proposed league – described by members of the sports establishment as an "outlaw league" – met in New York's Hotel Imperial. The U.S. Baseball League subsequently organized teams in Chicago, Cincinnati, Cleveland, Pittsburgh, New York, Reading, Pennsylvania; Richmond, Virginia; and Washington, D.C. The league president was William Witmann.

Sports historian Rudolf K. Haerle observed that the U.S. Baseball League "stressed the inherent 'good' of baseball for all individuals and communities, and indicated that it wished to conduct its business in the accepted capitalist style–free competition in the marketplace". Despite these lofty ambitions, the league quickly incurred the scorn and hostility of the baseball establishment. Additionally burdened with weak leadership, limited financing, poor attendance, and a lack of skillful players, the U.S. Baseball League "folded after about one month of action".

Legacy
Many sports historians view the U.S. Baseball League as "a major precursor to the Federal League of 1914–1915". The Federal League, which was the last independent major league, was financed by magnates including oil "baron" Harry F. Sinclair.

Teams
Chicago Green Sox
Cincinnati Cams/Pippins
Cleveland Forest City
New York Knickerbockers
Pittsburgh Filipinos
Reading
Richmond Rebels
Washington Senators

Standings

The league's regular season began May 1, 1912 and ended June 5. The Richmond Times Dispatch released the intended 126-game USL schedule, to have run from April 8 through September 22.

Ballparks
 Bronx Oval – New York
 Exposition Park – Pittsburgh
 The Fairgrounds – Lynchburg
 Georgetown Park – Washington, D.C.
 Hippodrome Park – Cincinnati, OH. The park was also referred to as United States Park
 Gunther Park (Clark St and Leland Ave) – Chicago; now Chase Park 
 National Association Grounds – Cleveland
 Lee Park (Moore Street and North Boulevard) – Richmond; became Boulevard Field of the Richmond Climbers in 1917, and now The Diamond

Notes

References
 Suehsdorf, A. D. (1978). The Great American Baseball Scrapbook. New York:  Random House. 

 
Defunct major baseball leagues in the United States
Sports leagues established in 1913
Defunct minor baseball leagues in the United States